Mount Gorecki is a mountain in Antarctica. It was discovered and photographed on January 13, 1956, on a U.S. Navy transcontinental non-stop plane flight from McMurdo Sound to the Weddell Sea and back, and was named by the Advisory Committee on Antarctic Names for aviation electronics technician Francis Gorecki, the radioman of the P2V-2N Neptune aircraft making the flight.

References

Mountains of Queen Elizabeth Land
Pensacola Mountains